The Hess triangle is a triangular tile mosaic set in a sidewalk in New York City's West Village neighborhood at the corner of Seventh Avenue and Christopher Street. The plaque reads "Property of the Hess Estate which has never been dedicated for public purposes." The plaque is an isosceles triangle, with a  base and  legs (sides).

The plaque is the result of a dispute between the city government and the estate of David Hess, a landlord from Philadelphia who owned the Voorhis, a five-story apartment building. In the early 1910s, the city claimed eminent domain to expropriate and demolish 253 buildings in the area in order to widen Seventh Avenue and expand the IRT subway. By 1913, the Hess family had exhausted all legal options. However, according to Ross Duff Wyttock writing in the Hartford Courant in 1928, Hess's heirs discovered that when the city seized the Voorhis the survey had missed a small corner of Plot 55 and they set up a notice of possession. The city asked the family to donate the diminutive property to the public, but they chose to hold out and installed the present, defiant mosaic on July 27, 1922.

Later, Yeshiva University came to own the property, including the Hess Triangle, and in October 1995 it was sold by Yeshiva to 70 Christopher Realty Corporation. Subsequent owners have left the plaque intact.

References

Christopher Street
West Village
Individual signs in the United States
1922 establishments in New York City
Triangles
20th century in New York City
Real estate holdout